An eponym is a person (real or fictitious) whose name has become identified with a particular object or activity.


Here is a list of eponyms:

L 
 Rudolf Laban, Slovakian choreographer – labanotation.
 René Lacoste, French tennis player – Lacoste.
 Joseph-Louis Lagrange, Italian-French mathematician and astronomer - Lagrange point.
 Ferruccio Lamborghini, Italian car builder – Lamborghini.
 Vincenzo Lancia, Italian car builder – Lancia.
 Francesco Landini, Italian composer – Landini cadence, might be described in its most characteristic form as a variation on the harmonic progression in which an unstable sixth (usually major) expands to a stable octave.
 Edwin Henry Landseer, British painter and sculptor – Landseer (dog).
 Paul Langerhans, German biologist – Islets of Langerhans, Langerhans cell, Langerhans cell histiocytosis.
 Samuel Pierpont Langley, American astronomer and physicist – langley a measurement of solar radiation.
 Lev Davidovich Landau, Azerbaijani-Russian physicist – Landau pole, Landau damping.
 Chris Langton, American computer scientist – Langton's ant.
 A. C. Larrieu, French moon observer - Larrieu's dam (a clair-obscur effect on the moon's surface during local sunset conditions, appearing like a rectilinear scarp-like feature at crater Polybius K) 
 Bent Larsen, Danish chess player – Larsen's Opening.
 Giovanni Paolo Lascaris, Italian nobleman – Lascaris towers, Lascaris Battery.
 Saint Lawrence of Rome, Italian Christian saint – Saint Lawrence River, San Lawrenz, and numerous other localities, churches and cathedrals.
 Ernest Lawrence, American physicist – lawrencium.
 Lazarus of Bethany, Biblical character – Lazarus sign, Lazarus syndrome, Lazarus taxon.
 Lech, Slavic mythological character – Lechites (Poles).
 Bruce Lee, American-Chinese actor – Bruceploitation.
 Peter Lee, English miner – Peterlee, a town in County Durham.
 Ernst Leitz, German businessman and photographer – Leica Camera.
 Alfredo di Lelio, Italian cook – Alfredo sauce.
 Vladimir Ilyich Lenin, Russian head of state – Leninism, Lenin's Testament, for various places see Lenino and List of places named after Lenin.
 John Lennard-Jones, British mathematician – Lennard-Jones potential
 Jules Léotard, French acrobat – leotard.
 Winford Lee Lewis, American chemist – lewisite.
 Lars Levi Læstadius, Swedish religious leader  – Laestadianism.
 Georg Christoph Lichtenberg, German physicist, satirist, and Anglophile - Lichtenberg figure.
 Alice Liddell, British child – Alice in Wonderland syndrome
 Liechtenstein dynasty, Liechtensteinian royal family – Liechtenstein.
 Alphonsus Liguori, Italian theologian – Liguorists (another name for Redemptorists).
 Gösta Hjalmar Liljequist, Swedish meteorologist - Liljequist parhelion
 Abraham Lincoln, American president – Lincoln Records; ships , ; Lincoln is a slang term for the United States five-dollar bill.
 Charles Lindbergh, American pilot – Lindbergh Law.
 Teunis van der Linden, Dutch chemist – Lindane.
 Jules Antoine Lissajous, French physicist - Lissajous curve, Lissajous orbit.
 Joseph Lister, British physician – Listerine mouthwash.
 Little Goody Two-Shoes, British literary character – The English derogatory term "goody two-shoes" for someone who is irritatingly bland and nice.
 David Livingstone, Scottish explorer – Livingstone daisy, Livingstone, Zambia.
 Ignacio de la Llave, Mexican general and governor.  – Veracruz-Llave
 Matthias de l'Obel (sometimes spelled as Lobel), Flemish physician and botanist – Lobelia.
 Sanford Lockwood Cluett, American businessman – Sanforization. 
 Veronica Lodge, American comics character – the Veronica search engine.
 James Harvey Logan, American judge and horticulturist – loganberry. 
 Fritz London, German physicist – London force.
 Ruy López de Segura, Spanish monk – Ruy Lopez opening in chess.
 Hendrik Lorentz, Dutch physicist – Lorentz force, Lorentz transformation.
 Lothar, German-French emperor – Lorraine, French province.
 Allan Haines Loughead, American aviator – Lockheed Corporation later to become Lockheed Martin in 1995.
 Louis IX of France, French king – St. Louis, Missouri and dozens of other places named Saint Louis
 Louis XIV of France, French king – Louisiana
 Pierre Charles Alexandre Louis, French physician – Angle of Louis.
 Princess Louise Caroline Alberta, fourth daughter of Queen Victoria – Alberta
 H. P. Lovecraft, American novelist – Lovecraftian horror
 Johann Tobias Lowitz, German-born Russian apothecary and experimental chemist - Lowitz arc
 Hubert von Luschka, German anatomist – foramina of Luschka (outlets for cerebrospinal fluid in the brain); Luschka's crypts; Luschka's joints.
 Saint Lucy of Syracuse, Italian Christian saint – Saint Lucia.
 Rosa Luxemburg, German politician – Luxemburgism
 Martin Luther, German religious leader – Lutheranism
 Alois Lutz, Austrian figure skater – Lutz jump
 Willem Jacob Luyten, Dutch-American astronomer - Luyten's star, Luyten's flare star (L 726-8)
 Charles Lynch, American politician – lynching, lynch law.
 Trofim Lysenko, Ukrainian-Russian biologist – Lysenkoism.

M 
 John Macadam, Scottish-Australian chemist – Macadamia.
 Ernst Mach, Czech-Austrian physicist – Mach number.
 Karel Hynek Mácha, Czech novelist and poet – Lake Mácha, in the Czech Republic
 Niccolò Machiavelli, Italian politician and writer – Machiavellianism.
 John Macdonald, New Zealand psychologist – Macdonald triad.
 Charles Macintosh, Scottish inventor – mackintosh
 Alexander Mackenzie, American explorer – Mackenzie River, Mackenzie Bay
 Colin Maclaurin, Scottish mathematician – Maclaurin series, Maclaurin's inequality, Sectrix of Maclaurin, Trisectrix of Maclaurin.
 Rowland Hussey Macy, American businessman – Macy's.
 Johann Heinrich von Mädler, German astronomer - the Mädler phenomenon (comet-tail like arcs near the observed image of bright planet Venus, the same entoptic phenomenon as Purkyne's blue arcs near an unsteady red-colored pointlike lightsource), Mädler's square (a more-or-less rectangle shaped formation near crater Fontenelle on the moon's surface)
 George Maduro, Dutch resistance fighter – Madurodam.
 Gaius Maecenas, Roman patron of literature and the arts – maecenas (arts patron)
 Ferdinand Magellan, Portuguese explorer – Strait of Magellan, Large Magellanic Cloud, Small Magellanic Cloud
 François Magendie, French physiologist – foramen of Magendie.
 Pierre Magnol, French botanist – magnolia.
 Heinrich Gustav Magnus, German chemist – Magnus effect, Magnus's green salt.
 Jules Germain François Maisonneuve, French surgeon – Maisonneuve fracture.
 Nestor Makhno, Ukrainian revolutionary leader – Makhnovism.
 Mrs. Malaprop, a character in The Rivals, a play by Richard Brinsley Sheridan – malapropism.
 La Malinche, Aztec translator – Malinchism, Malinche (volcano).
 G. Kenneth Mallory American physician, and Soma Weiss, Hungarian physician – Mallory–Weiss syndrome.
 Marcello Malpighi, Italian surgeon – Malpighian corpuscles, Malpighian tubule system, Malpighian pyramids, Malpighiaceae
 Thomas Malthus, British economist – Malthusian, Malthusianism, Malthusian Growth Model, Malthusian catastrophe
 Giorgio and Gregorio Mamo, Maltese land owners – Mamo Tower
 Nelson Mandela, South African activist and president – Mandela effect, Nelson Mandela Day, Madiba shirt ("Madiba" was Mandela's nickname, derived from his tribe).
 Benoît Mandelbrot, Polish mathematician – Mandelbrot set.
 Mani, Mesopotamian religious leader – Manichaeism.
 Russ Manning, American comics artist – Russ Manning Award
 Manolete, Spanish bullfighter – "Manoletina technique".
 Antoine Marfan, French physician – Marfan syndrome.
 Margherita of Savoy, Italian queen – pizza margherita. although it probably was not called "Margherita". In 1830, in the book Napoli, contorni e dintorni, written by Riccio, it was described as a pizza with tomato, mozzarella and basil.
 Henrietta Maria of France, French-born English queen – Maryland
 Queen Mariana of Austria or Marie-Anne of Austria, Austrian-born Spanish queen – Mariana Islands, Mariana Trench
 Pierre Marie, French neurologist – Charcot–Marie–Tooth disease
 Mariko Aoki, Japanese essayist – Mariko Aoki phenomenon.
 Giambattista Marino, Italian poet – Marinism.
 Saint Marinus, Christian saint – San Marino
 Mark the Evangelist, Christian saint – Saint Mark's Tower
 Benjamin Markarian, Armenian astrophysicist – Markarian galaxies
 Michael Marks and Thomas Spencer, British businessmen – Marks and Spencer
 Géza Maróczy, Hungarian chess player – Maróczy Bind
 Mars, Greek-Roman mythological character – Martius (month), Mars (planet)
 Frank Mars, American businessman – Mars (chocolate bar)
 James Marsh, British chemist and inventor - Marsh test. 
 Frank Marshall, American chess player – Marshall Defense
 George C. Marshall, American general – Marshall Plan.
 John Marshall, British explorer – Marshall Islands
 Maurice Martenot, French inventor – Ondes Martenot
 Henry Martin, American businessman – Martinizing Dry Cleaning
 Lionel Martin, British businessman – Aston Martin
 Glenn Luther Martin, American businessman – Glenn L. Martin Company (later Lockheed Martin).
 Jean Martinet, French militarian – martinet (a disciplinarian).
 Alessandro Martini, Italian businessman – Martini (cocktail), Martini (vermouth).
 Groucho Marx, American comedian and film actor – Groucho glasses, Grouchoesque. 
 Karl Marx, German philosopher and economist – Marxism.
 Mary, mother of Jesus – numerous communities and geographic features (either named St. Mary or having the word Lady in them) like the Marists, a large number of cathedrals, churches, and religious orders, the ladybird
 Mary the Jewess, ancient alchemist – Bain-marie to warm substances such as Elixir to germinate precious metals.
 Alfieri Maserati, Italian businessman – Maserati.
 Abraham Maslow, American psychologist – Maslow's hammer, Maslow's hierarchy of needs, Maslow-Toffler School of Futuristic Education, and Maslowian portfolio theory.
 Charles Mason and Jeremiah Dixon, British astronomers – Mason–Dixon Line.
 John L. Mason, American inventor – Mason jar.
 Alonzo C. Mather, American businessman – Mather Stock Car Company.
 Matilda Joslyn Gage, suffragist and abolitionist — Matilda effect.
 Matthew the Apostle, Biblical prophet – Matthew effect.
 Harold Matson and Elliot Handler, American businessmen – Mattel.
 Jujiro Matsuda, Japanese businessman – Mazda (also possibly inspired by Zoroastrian god Ahura Mazda)
 Queen Maud of Norway, Norwegian queen – Queen Maud Gulf (Canada), Queen Maud Land in Antarctica, Queen Maud fromage.
 Maurice of Nassau, Dutch politician – Mauritius
 Paul Mauser and Wilhelm Mauser, German businessmen – Mauser gun
 Maussollus, Carian king – mausoleum.
 Max und Moritz, German comics/literary characters – Max & Moritz Prize
 Hiram Maxim, American gun inventor – Maxim gun
 James Clerk Maxwell, British physicist – maxwell, Maxwell equations, Maxwell's spot (a bright magenta colored spot at the center of vision, when looking at a deep purple or violet background or through a violet color filter)
 Louis B. Mayer, American film producer – Louis B. Mayer Pictures which later merged into Metro–Goldwyn–Mayer (or MGM).
 Walther Mayer and Leopold Vietoris, Austrian mathematicians – Mayer–Vietoris axiom, Mayer–Vietoris theorem.
 Thabo Mbeki, South-African president – Mbekite.
 John Loudon McAdam, Scottish engineer – macadam process of road construction, tarmac (tar+macadam) road surface
 Charles McBurney, American surgeon – McBurney's point (aka McBurney's sign), a sign of acute appendicitis.
 Joseph McCarthy, American politician – McCarthyism.
 Richard and Maurice McDonald, American businesspeople –  McDonald's Corporation
 James Smith McDonnell, American businessman – McDonnell Aircraft Corporation, later to become McDonnell Douglas.
 Giuseppe Meazza, Italian association football player and manager – Stadio Giuseppe Meazza.
 Medusa, Greek mythological character – Medusa (biology), Medusa piercing, Medusa pepper, Medusaceratops.
 Heinrich Meibome, German physician – Meibomian gland
 Henri Meige, French neurologist – Meige's syndrome
 Georg Meissner, German anatomist – Meissner's corpuscles
 Walther Meissner and Robert Ochsenfeld, German physicists – Meissner effect (or Meissner–Ochsenfeld effect)
 Lise Meitner, Austrian-Swedish physicist – meitnerium.
 Meiji, Japanese emperor – Meiji Shrine.
 Nellie Melba, Australian opera singer – Melba toast, Peach Melba, Melba (a suburb of Canberra, Australia)
 William Lamb, 2nd Viscount Melbourne, British Prime Minister – Melbourne.
 Gregor Mendel, Czech botanist – Mendelian inheritance, Mendel Polar Station.
 Dmitri Mendeleev, Russian chemist – mendelevium, periodic table of Mendeleev
 Prosper Ménière, French physician – Ménière's disease
 Mentor, Greek mythological character – mentor (a trusted friend, counselor or teacher, usually a more experienced person), mentoring programs.
 Giuseppe Mercalli, Italian seismologist – Mercalli intensity scale of an earthquake
 Gerard Mercator, Flemish cartographer – Mercator projection.
 Nicholas Mercator, German mathematician – Mercator series.
 John Mercer, British chemist – mercerised cotton.
 Ismail Merchant, British film producer, and James Ivory, American film director – Merchant Ivory Productions.
 Mercury Greek-Roman mythological character – Mercury (planet), Mercury (element) and Mercury poisoning.
 Robert Mertens, Russian-German biologist – Mertensian mimicry, Robert Mertens's day gecko, Mertens' water monitor. 
 Charles Merrill, American businessman – Merrill Lynch.
 Marin Mersenne, French mathematician – Mersenne prime, Mersenne's laws, Mersenne twister.
 Franz Anton Mesmer, German hypnotist – Mesmerism, "to mesmerize".
 Messalina, Roman empress – a messalina (debaucherous woman), messaline. 
 Wilhelm Messerschmitt, German engineer – Messerschmitt.
 Charles Messier, French astronomer – Messier object.
 Ioannis Metaxas, Greek Prime Minister – Metaxism.
 Robert Metcalfe, American electrical engineer – Metcalfe's law
 Methuselah, Biblical character – A Methuselah (nickname for a very old person), Methuselah (6-litre wine bottle see Wine bottle#Sizes)
 Saint Michael, Biblical character – Order of Saint Michael and Saint George, Arkhangelsk, and numerous other places with St Michael or Archangel in them.
 André Michelin, French businessman – Michelin, Michelin guide.
 Giovanni Michelotti, Italian businessman – Michelotti.
 Carl Miele, German businessman – Miele
 Jacques Mieses, German chessplayer – Mieses Opening
 Caspar Milquetoast, American comics character – Milquetoast (a weak, ineffectual or bland person.)
 Hermann Minkowski, German mathematician – Minkowski addition, Minkowski inequality, Minkowski space, Minkowski diagram, Minkowski's theorem.
Minos, mythological king of Crete, for whom the Minoan civilization is named. 
 Marcel Minnaert, Belgian-Dutch astronomer – Minnaert resonance, Minnaert function.
 Minthe, Greek mythological character – Mentha
 Ernesto Miranda, American criminal – Miranda Warning
 Miriam, Biblical character – bain-Marie
 Mithridates VI of Pontus, king – mithridatium, mithridatism.
 Walter Mitty, American literary character – a "Walter Mitty" (a hopeless dreamer).
 Sakuzo Miyamori, Japanese observer of the moon's surface - Miyamori valley (a so-called valley between craters Lohrmann and Riccioli, near the western limb of the moon's Earth-faced hemisphere).
 Mobutu, Zaïrese president – Mobutism.
 August Ferdinand Moebius, German astronomer and mathematician – Moebius strip
 Paul Julius Möbius, German neurologist – Möbius syndrome.
 Moctezuma II, Aztec emperor – Montezuma's revenge. 
 Morgan le Fay, British mythological character – Fata Morgana.
 Andrija Mohorovičić, Croatian seismologist – Mohorovičić discontinuity
 Jarmo Moilanen - Moilanen arc (a rare V-shaped halo phenomenon)
 Gert Molière, German mathematician – Molière radius.
 Luis de Molina, Spanish religious leader – Molinism.
 Jacob Anton Moll, Dutch physician – Moll's gland
 Vyacheslav Molotov, Russian politician – Molotov cocktail
 James Monroe, American president – Monroe Doctrine, Monrovia
 Marilyn Monroe, American film actress – Monroe piercing
 Montanus, Christian religious leader – Montanism
 Moses Montefiore, British banker – Montefiore Medical Center.
 Maria Montessori, Italian educator – Montessori education.
 Ambroise Monell, American businessman – Monel metal.
 Louis de Montfort, French religious leader – Montfortians.
 Giuseppe Monti, Italian botanist – Montia.
 The Montgolfier Brothers, French inventors – Montgolfier balloon.
 Bernard Montgomery, British general – monty coat, nickname for a Duffel coat., Montgomery cocktail.
 William Fetherstone Montgomery, Irish obstetrician – Glands of Montgomery.
 Monty Python, British comedy collective – Pythonesque. 
 Robert Moog, American inventor – Moog synthesizer.
 Sun Myung Moon, South-Korean religious leader – Moonie.
 Gordon Moore, American businessman – Moore's law.
 Jean Moreau de Sechelles, French politician – Seychelles
 José María Morelos, Mexican revolutionary – Morelos, Morelia.
 Prince Morgan the Old of Gwent, Welsh king – Glamorgan.
 Mormon, American mythological prophet – Mormonism.
 Ernst Moro, Austrian physician – Moro reflex.
 Samuel Morse, British inventor – Morse code.
 Morpheus, Greek mythological character – morfine.
 John Morton, English archbishop of Canterbury – Morton's Fork (a choice between two equally unpleasant alternatives), Morton's fork coup.
 Jerry Moss and Herb Alpert, American musicians – A&M Records.
 Rudolf Mössbauer, German physicist – Mössbauer effect.
 Lord Louis Mountbatten, British naval officer – Mountbatten pink.
 Mickey Mouse, American cartoon character – Mickey Mousing, Mickey Mouse degrees
 Mowgli, British-Indian literary character – Mowgli syndrome.
 Wolfgang Amadeus Mozart, German-Austrian composer – Mozartkugel, Mozart effect, Mozart Medal, the word 'Mozart' became synonymous for '(musical) child prodigy' and 'virtuoso'
 Erasto B. Mpemba, Tanzanian physicist – Mpemba effect
 Antonín Mrkos, Czech astronomer – The comets 18D/Perrine-Mrkos, 45P/Honda-Mrkos-Pajdusakova, 124P/Mrkos and 143P/Kowal-Mrkos.
 Muhammad, Saudi-Arabian religious leader – Muhammadanism
 Fritz Müller, German biologist – Müllerian mimicry
 Walther Müller, German physicist – Geiger–Müller tube
 Franz Carl Müller-Lyer, German psychologist and sociologist — Müller-Lyer illusion.
 David Mulligan, American hotel manager – Mulligan.
 Baron Munchausen, German baron – Munchausen syndrome, Munchausen syndrome by proxy
 Ian Murdock, American software engineer, and Debra Murdock, his wife. – Debian project for free software, made after combining Ian's and his wife's name Debra.
 Edward A. Murphy, Jr., American engineer – Murphy's law.
 William Lawrence Murphy, American inventor – Murphy bed.
 The Muses, Greek mythological characters – a muse, musaeum, museum.
 Mytyl and Tytltyl, Belgian theatrical characters – Mytyl school and Tyltyl school.

N 
 Ashot Nadanian, Armenian chess player – Nadanian Variation
 Oskar Naegeli, Swiss chess player – Naegeli–Franceschetti–Jadassohn syndrome
 Miguel Najdorf, Polish-Argentine chess player – Sicilian Defence, Najdorf Variation
 Fridtjof Nansen, Norwegian explorer – Nansen passport
 John Napier, Scottish mathematician – neper, unit of relative power level, Napier's bones, method for performing multiplication.
 Napoleon I, Corsican-French general and emperor – Napoleonic code, Napoleonic Wars, Napoleon complex, Napoleon Opening, Napoleon cake.
 Narcissus, Greek mythological character – narcissism.
 John Forbes Nash, British mathematician – Nash equilibrium, Nash embedding theorem.
 Francis Nash, American general – Nashville, Tennessee and all other cities named Nashville in the United States.
 Joachim Neander, German poet – Neanderthal (valley) was named after him, and thus the Neandertal fossil found there.
 Nebuchadnezzar, Babylonian king – nebuchadnezzar, 15-litre wine bottle.
 Francis Negus, British military officer – negus.
 Jawaharlal Nehru, Indian politician – Nehru jacket, Nehru Planetarium.
 Horatio Nelson, British admiral – Nelson (New Zealand), Nelson hold. 
 Nemesis, Greek-Roman mythological character – a nemesis (arch enemy). 
 Neptunus, Roman mythological character – neptunium.
 Walther Nernst, German chemist – Nernst effect, Nernst lamp. 
 Nero, Roman emperor – Nero Decree, Nero Burning ROM.
 Henri Nestlé, German-Swiss businessman – Nestlé.
 Nestorius, Patriarch of Constantinople  – nestorianism
 John von Neumann, Hungarian-American mathematician and computer programmer – Von Neumann machine, Von Neumann probe, Von Neumann architecture, John von Neumann Theory Prize, IEEE John von Neumann Medal
 Rolf Nevanlinna, Finnish mathematician – Nevanlinna theory.
 Isaac Newton, British mathematician and physicist – newton – unit of force, Newton's law of cooling, Newton's law of gravitation, Newton's laws of motion, Newton's rings, Newtonian reflecting telescope.
 Nicarao, Nahua ruler – Nicaragua.
 William Nicol, Scottish geologist and physicist - Nicol prism.
 Jean Nicot, French explorer – nicotine.
 Arthur Nielsen, American market analyst – Nielsen ratings, Nielsen Media Research.
 Florence Nightingale, British nurse – Nightingale Pledge, Florence Nightingale effect.
 Niobe, Greek-Roman mythological character – niobium.
 Aron Nimzowitsch, Latvian-Russian-Danish chessplayer – Nimzo–Indian Defence.
 Peter Norman Nissen, Canadian-American-British engineer – Nissen hut. 
 Richard Nixon, American president – Nixonomics, Nixon mask.
 Alfred Nobel, Swedish inventor and activist – Nobel Prizes, nobelium.
 Emmy Noether, German mathematician – Noether's theorem, Noetherian rings.
 Norbert of Xanten, German bishop – The Norbertines.
 Ian Norman and Gerry Harvey, Australian businessmen – Harvey Norman.
 Edward Lawry Norton, American engineer – Norton's theorem.
 Peter Norton, American businessman – Norton AntiVirus.
 Pedro Nunes, Portuguese mathematician and inventor – nonius

O 
 Barack Obama, American President – Obamacare, Obamanomics.
 Obsius, discoverer (in Pliny) of an obsidian-like stone – obsidian.
 Oceanus, Greek-Roman mythological character – ocean.
 Robert Ochsenfeld and Walter Meissner, German physicists – Meissner–Ochsenfeld effect (Meissner effect).
 William of Ockham, British philosopher – Occam's Razor.
 Odysseus, Greek mythological character – odyssey.
 Oedipus, Greek mythological character – Oedipus complex.
 Oengus I of the Picts, Pictian king – Angus.
 Georg Ohm, German physicist – ohm, Ohm's law, Ohm's acoustic law.
 Nobuo Okishio, Japanese economist – Okishio's theorem
 Onan, Biblical character – onanism.
 Eugene Onegin, Russian literary character – Onegin stanza.
 John Joseph O'Neill, American journalist - O'Neill's bridge (a so-called artificial bridge on the moon's surface, between Promontorium Lavinium and Promontorium Olivium at the western part of Mare Crisium's rim).
 Jan Oort, Dutch astronomer – Oort cloud.
 Adam Opel, German businessman – Opel.
 Daphne Oram, British composer and electronic musician - Oramics.
 William of Orange, Dutch politician – Orangism.
 Leonard Ornstein, Dutch physicist – Ornstein–Zernike equation, Ornstein–Uhlenbeck process.
 Orpheus, Greek mythological character – orphism (religion), orphism (art), Orphean warbler.
 Charles Boyle, 4th Earl of Orrery, British nobleman – the orrery.
 Hans Christian Ørsted, Danish physicist and chemist – oersted, unit of magnetic field strength.
 George Orwell, British novelist – Orwellian.
 Robert Bayley Osgood, American physician and Carl B. Schlatter, Swiss physician – Osgood–Schlatter disease.
 Osman I, Turkish sultan – Ottoman Empire.
 Wilhelm Ostwald, Latvian-German chemist – Ostwald process.
 Nicolaus Otto, German engineer and inventor – Otto engine.
 John Owen, British chess player – Owen's Defence.
 Robert Owen, Welsh social reformer and activist – Owenism.

P 
 Giuseppe Pace, Maltese bishop – Paceville
 David Packard and William Hewlett, American business people – Hewlett-Packard
 Larry Page, American businessman – PageRank algorithm.
 Reza Shah Pahlavi, Iranian shah – Pahlavi hat.
 František Palacký, Czech historian and politician – Palacký University, Olomouc.
 Andrea Palladio, Italian architect – Palladian architecture, Palladian villas, palazzo.
 Peter Simon Pallas, Russian biologist and botanist – pallasite.
 Arnold Palmer, British golfer – Arnold Palmer.
 Pamela, British literary character – Pamela hat.
 Pamphilus, Italian theatrical character – pamphlet. 
 Pan, Greek mythological character – panflute, the word panic, Peter Pan
 Peter Pan, British theatrical character – Peter Pan syndrome, Peter Pan collar.
 Panacea, Greek mythological character – panacea.
 Pandora, Greek mythological character – Pandora's box.
 Pantalone, Italian theatrical character – pantalone, pants. 
 Paparazzo, a press photographer in Federico Fellini's film La Dolce Vita – paparazzi.
 Denis Papin, French inventor – papinian cooking pot, Papin's digester
 Vilfredo Pareto, Italian economist – Pareto principle, Pareto efficiency, Pareto distribution, Pareto index
 Bernard Parham, American chess player – Parham Attack.
 C. Northcote Parkinson, British historian – Parkinson's law. 
 James Parkinson, British physician – Parkinson's disease.
 Rosa Parks, American activist – Rosa Parks Highway.
 Antoine-Augustin Parmentier, French agronome – Hachis Parmentier.
 Sir William Edward Parry, Anglo-Welsh explorer of the Arctic - Parry arc.
 Blaise Pascal, French mathematician – pascal, Pascal's triangle, Pascal's Wager or Pascal's Gambit, Pascal programming language, Pascal's theorem.
 Louis Pasteur, French chemist  – Pasteurization.
 Saint Paul – Saint Paul (Minnesota), São Paulo, St Paul's Island, St. Paul's Bay, St. Paul's Bay Tower, and numerous other localities, churches and cathedrals.
 Vincent de Paul, French humanitarian activist and priest – Society of Saint Vincent de Paul.
 Antoine de Paule, Maltese knight – Paola, Malta.
 Wolfgang Pauli, Austrian-Swiss physicist – Pauli exclusion principle.
 Axel Paulsen, Norwegian figure skater – Axel jump.
 Ivan Petrovich Pavlov, Russian biologist – Pavlovian conditioning.
 Anna Pavlova, Russian ballet dancer – Pavlova.
 John Pazmino, American amateur astronomer — Pazmino's cluster (Stock 23: an open star cluster between the constellations Camelopardalis and Cassiopeia, containing the double star Σ 362).
 Giuseppe Peano, Italian mathematician – Peano axioms.
 Mr. Pecksniff, British literary character – Pecksniffian
 Pelagius, British theologian – pelagianism.
 Pelé, Brazilian football player – Pelé Law.
 Jean Charles Athanase Peltier, French physicist – Peltier effect, Peltier coefficient, Peltier plate.
 William Penn, British-American politician and explorer – Pennsylvania.
 James Cash Penney, American business man – J. C. Penney.
 Roger Penrose, British mathematician – Penrose diagram, Penrose tiling, Penrose triangle, Penrose stairs, Penrose chickens
 Ramon Perellos y Roccaful, Maltese knight – Perellos Redoubt, Perellos Tower.
 Dom Pérignon, French monk – Dom Pérignon.
 Juan Perón, Argentine president – Peronism.
 Louis Perrier, French physician and business man – Perrier.
 Louis-Jérôme Perrot, French civil engineer – perrotine printing. 
 Antoinette Perry, American actress and theatre director – Tony Award
 Fred Perry, British tennis player – Fred Perry shirt.
 John J. Pershing, American general – Pershing boot.
 Philippe Pétain, French general and politician – Petainisme.
 Saints Peter and Fevronia, Russian Christian saints – Peter and Fevronia Day.
 Saint Peter, apostle of Jesus Christ – Saint-Pierre and Miquelon, Saint Petersburg, Peterborough, and numerous other localities, churches and cathedrals.
 Laurence J. Peter, Canadian pedagogue – Peter principle.
 Arno Peters, German historian – Gall–Peters projection.
 Alexander Petrov, Russian chess player – Petrov's Defence
 Armand Peugeot, French car builder and business man – Peugeot.
 Phaeton, Greek mythological character – Phaeton (carriage).
 François-André Danican Philidor, French composer and chess player – Philidor Defence.
 Dallas B. Phemister, surgeon – Phemister graft
 Philip II of Macedon, Macedonian king – Philippic. 
 Philip II of Spain, Spanish king – Philippines.
 Gerard Philips, Dutch businessman – Philips.
 Émile Picard, French mathematician – Picard horn.
 Mary Pickford, American film actress – Mary Pickford.
 Samuel Pickwick , British literary character – Pickwickian syndrome.
 Lester Piggott, British horse race jockey – Lester Award.
 Joseph Pilates, German physical trainer – the Pilates Method.
 Józef Piłsudski, Polish general and president – Piłsudskiite.
 James Pimm, British businessman – Pimm's.
 Christopher Pinchbeck, British clockmaker – Pinchbeck. The term "pinchbeck" has entered the English language to signify the alloy Pinchbeck created. Because the alloy could be used to replace gold, the word is also used to signify something less than genuine; a counterfeit; a fake; a sham or fraud.
 Pinocchio, Italian literary character – Pinocchio Syndrome, Pinocchio paradox.
 Harold Pinter, British playwright – Pinteresque.
 Vasja Pirc, Slovenian chess player – Pirc Defence.
 Giovanni Battista Pirelli, Italian businessman and engineer – Pirelli, Pirelli Calendar.
 François Gayot de Pitaval, French lawyer – pitaval. 
 William Pitt the Elder, British Prime Minister – Pittsburgh.
 Pius IX, Italian pope – pionono.
 Max Planck, German physicist – Planck constant, Planck's law of black body radiation
 Joseph Plateau, Belgian physicist – Plateau's laws, Plateau's problem.
 Plato, Greek philosopher  – Platonic solids, Platonic love, Neoplatonism.
 Samuel Plimsoll, English politician – Plimsoll line, Plimsoll shoe.
 Henry Stanley Plummer, American physician – Plummer's disease, Plummer–Vinson syndrome, Plummer's nail.
 Friedrich Carl Alwin Pockels, German physicist – Pockels effect, Pockels cell.
 Joel Roberts Poinsett, American politician and botanist – poinsettia
 Jean Léonard Marie Poiseuille, French physicist – poise, Poiseuille's Law.
 Joseph Polchinski, American physicist – Polchinski's paradox.
 Marco Polo, Italian explorer – Marco Polo sheep, Marco Polo (game).
 Madame de Pompadour, official chief mistress of King Louis XV - Pompadour (hairstyle).
 Charles Ponzi, Italian criminal – Ponzi scheme.
 Domenico Lorenzo Ponziani, Italian chess player – Ponziani Opening.
 Eugène Poubelle, French lawyer, administrator and diplomat – poubelle, French word for "dustbin".
 Pierre Poujade, French politician – Poujadism.
 Ferdinand Porsche, Italian car designer – Porsche.
 Grigori Aleksandrovich Potemkin, Russian general – Potemkin village.
 Percivall Pott, British surgeon – Pott's disease, Pott's fracture.
 Pierre Poujade, French politician – Poujadism.
 Enoch Powell, British politician – Powellism.
 Elvis Presley, American rock 'n' roll singer – Elvis impersonator, Elvis taxon, Elvis quiff.
 Priapus, Greek mythological character – priapism.
 Prince Edward, Duke of Kent and Strathearn, British prince – Prince Edward Island.
 Prince Rupert of the Rhine, German prince and inventor – Rupert's Land, Prince Rupert's drop, Prince metal or Prince Rupert metal.
 Procrustes, Greek mythological character – Procrustean bed, Procrustean measures (situations where different lengths or sizes or properties are fitted to an arbitrary standard, often with ruthless disregard of individual differences or special circumstances), Procrustes analysis, Generalized Procrustes analysis, Orthogonal Procrustes problem.
 William Procter and James Gamble, British businesspeople – Procter & Gamble.
 Prometheus, Greek mythological character – Prometheism, Promethium.
 William Prout, British chemist – Prout's hypothesis.
 Joseph Proust, French chemist – Proust's law, Proustite.
 Marcel Proust, French writer – Proustian, Proust Questionnaire.
 Proteus, Greek mythological character – the adjective "protean" (versatile, mutable, capable of assuming many forms), Proteus syndrome, Proteus effect.
 Karl Prusik, Austrian mountaineer – Prusikclimbing technique of going up or down a rope using knots.
 Nikolay Przhevalsky, Russisch biologist – Przewalski's horse
 James Puckle, British inventor – Puckle gun.
 Hermann, Fürst von Pückler-Muskau, German prince – Fürst-Pückler-Eis (Prince Pückler ice-cream).
 Carl P. Pulfrich, German physicist - Pulfrich effect.
 Joseph Pulitzer, Hungarian businessman – Pulitzer Prize.
 George Pullman, American businessman and engineer – Pullman sleeping cars.
 Jan Evangelista Purkyně, Czech anatomist and physiologist – Purkinje cell, Purkinje effect, Purkinje shift, Purkinje images, Purkinje fibres.
 Pygmy, Greek mythological characters – Pygmy. 
 Pyrrho, Greek philosopher – Pyrrhonism.
 Pyrrhus of Epirus, Greek general – Pyrrhic victory
 Pythagoras, Greek mathematician – Pythagorean theorem, Pythagorean triple, Pythagorean tuning, Pythagorean expectation, Pythagorean hammers, Pythagorean trigonometric identity, Pythagoreanism, Neopythagoreanism.
 Python, Greek mythological character – python.

Q 
 Graman Quassi, Surinamese botanist – quassia.
 Adolphe Quetelet, Belgian astronomer, mathematician, statistician, sociologist - Quetelet rings
 Antoine Quinquet, French pharmacist and inventor – Quinquet lamp. 
 Vidkun Quisling, Norwegian war criminal – the term "quisling" became a synonym in many European languages for traitor.

R 
 Raël, French religious leader – Raëlism.
 Thomas Stamford Raffles, British governor – Rafflesia.
 FitzRoy Somerset, 1st Baron Raglan, British nobleman and military officer – Raglan sleeve.
 Friedrich Wilhelm Raiffeisen, German businessman – Raiffeisenbank.
 C. V. Raman, Indian physicist – Raman spectroscopy, Raman effect.
 Srinivasa Ramanujan, Indian mathematician – Ramanujan prime, Ramanujan theta function, Ramanujan's sum, Ramanujan's master theorem, Landau–Ramanujan constant, Ramanujan–Soldner constant, Ramanujan–Petersson conjecture, Rogers–Ramanujan identities, Hardy–Ramanujan number.
 John Rambo, American literary and film character – a "Rambo" (a reckless person who disregards orders and uses violence to solve problems), "Rambo strategy", "Rambo lawyer" (one who habitually engages in "all manners of adversarial excess, including personal attacks on other lawyers, hostility, boorish and insulting behavior, rudeness and obstructionist conduct" or embraces "a 'take no prisoners' attitude.",) "Rambo knife" (nickname for a Bowie knife in several languages). 
 William John Macquorn Rankine, Scottish engineer, physicist and mathematician – Rankine scale, Rankine cycle.
 Aleksandar Ranković, Yugoslav politician – Rankovićism.
 Raphael, Italian painter – Pre-Raphaelite Brotherhood.
 John William Strutt, 3rd Baron Rayleigh, British physicist and mathematician – Rayleigh criterion, Rayleigh scattering.
 Maurice Raynaud, French physician – Raynaud's disease.
 Ronald Reagan, American film actor and president – Reagan Era, Reaganomics, Reagan Doctrine, Ronald Reagan Washington National Airport, Ronald Reagan Trail.
 René Antoine Ferchault de Réaumur, French biologist – degree Réaumur.
 Martin de Redin, Spanish military and politician – De Redin towers.
 Orville Redenbacher, American businessman – Orville Redenbacher.
 Dorothy Reed Mendenhall, American physician, and Carl Sternberg, Austrian pathologist – Reed–Sternberg cell.
 Rehoboam, Hebrew king – 4.5-litre wine bottle (see Wine bottle#Sizes).
 Eliphalet Remington, American businessman – Remington Arms, Remington Products.
 André Renard, Belgian politician – Renardism.
 Louis Renault, French industrialist  – Renault.
 Alfréd Rényi, Hungarian mathematician – Rényi entropy.
 Ernst Renz, German circus owner – Circus Renz.
 Richard Réti, Slovakian chess player – Réti Opening.
 Nicolas-Edme Rétif, French novelist – retifism.
 Paul Reuter, German-British journalist and businessman – Reuters news agency.
 Douglas Reye, Australian physician – Reye syndrome.
 R. J. Reynolds, American businessman – R. J. Reynolds Tobacco Company.
 Rhea, Greek mythological character – Rhea (a type of bird genus).
 Rhesus of Thrace, Thracian mythological character – rhesus macaque.
 Cecil Rhodes, British explorer and industrialist – Northern Rhodesia (Now Zambia), Southern Rhodesia (Now Zimbabwe), Rhodes Scholarship.
 Giovanni Francesco Ricasoli, Italian knight – Fort Ricasoli.
 Isaac Rice, German-American businessman and chess player – Rice Gambit.
 Nina Ricci, Italian fashion designer – Nina Ricci (brand).
 Charles Richter, American seismologist – Richter magnitude scale.
 Howard Taylor Ricketts, American pathologist – rickettsia.
 Gerrit Rietveld, Dutch architect and furniture designer – Rietveld chair, Gerrit (software), Rietveld (software).
 Sydney Ringer, British pharmacologist – Ringer's solution and Ringer's lactate solution given via the IV route to patients.
 Heinrich Adolf Rinne, German physician – Rinne test.
 Robert L. Ripley, American comics artist – Ripley's Believe It or Not!.
 Eliyahu Rips, Latvian-Israeli mathematician – Rips machine.
 César Ritz, Swiss hotel owner – Ritz Hotel, Hôtel Ritz, "ritzy" (term for something luxurious). 
 Ron Rivest, American computer scientist – the first letter of the name RSA (the "R" in this asymmetric algorithm for public key cryptography is taken from Rivest).
 Hal Roach, American film producer – Hal Roach Comedies.
 Jean Robin, French botanist – Robinia.
 Paul Robert, French novelist – Petit Robert.
 Oral Roberts, American evangelist – Oral Roberts University.
 Yves Rocher, French businessman – Yves Rocher (company).
 John D. Rockefeller, American businessman – Oysters Rockefeller, Rockefeller Foundation.
 John D. Rockefeller, Jr., American businessman – Rockefeller Center.
 Nelson Rockefeller, American politician – Rockefeller Republican.
 Norman Rockwell, American painter and illustrator – Rockwellesque. 
 Diogo Rodrigues, Portuguese explorer – Rodrigues Island
 Alvah Roebuck and Richard Sears, American businesspeople – Sears, Roebuck, now Sears.
 Francis Rogallo, American aeronautical engineer/inventor - Rogallo wing.
 Leonard James Rogers , British mathematician – Rogers–Ramanujan identity.
 Roy Rogers, American film actor and singer – Roy Rogers (cocktail).
 Will Rogers, American comedian and actor – Will Rogers phenomenon.
 Otto Röhm and Otto Haas, German businessmen – Rohm & Haas.
 Roland, French knight – "to give a Roland for an Oliver" (offering to give as good as one gets).
 Charles Rolls and Henry Royce, British businesspeople – Rolls-Royce.
 Moritz Heinrich Romberg, German physician – Romberg's test, Parry–Romberg syndrome, Howship–Romberg sign.
 Nicola Romeo, Italian businessman – Alfa Romeo.
 Romulus, Roman mythological character – Rome.
 Vasco Ronchi, Italian physicist  – Ronchi test, Ronchi ruling.
 Pierre de Ronsard, French poet – Rosa 'Eden'.
 Wilhelm Röntgen, German inventor – röntgen, unit of dosage of X-rays or gamma radiation.
 Andrés Quintana Roo, Mexican politician – Quintana Roo.
 Alice Roosevelt, American presidential daughter – Alice blue.
 Theodore Roosevelt, American president – Teddy bear.
 Hermann Rorschach, Swiss psychiatrist and psychoanalyst – Rorschach test.
 Gioacchino Rossini, Italian composer – Tournedos Rossini.
 Eugène Rousseau, French chess player – Rousseau Gambit.
 Henry Isaac Rowntree, British businessman – Rowntree's.
 Henry Royce and Charles Rolls, British businesspeople – Rolls–Royce.
 Ruaidhrí mac Raghnaill, Hebridean magnate, Clann Ruaidhrí.
 Peter Paul Rubens, Flemish painter – Rubenesque (term used to describe chubby, obese women). 
 Ernő Rubik, Hungarian inventor – Rubik's Cube, Rubik's Clock, Rubik's Magic, Rubik's Revenge.
 Heinrich Daniel Ruhmkorff, German inventor – Ruhmkorff commutator, Ruhmkorff coil.
 Rumpelstiltskin, German fairy tale character – Rumpelstiltskin principle.
 Johan Ludwig Runeberg, Finnish poet – Runeberg torte. 
 Carle David Tolmé Runge, German mathematician and physicist – Runge's phenomenon.
 Damon Runyon, American journalist and writer – Runyonesque, Damon Runyon Stakes, Damon Runyon character 
 Bertrand Russell, British philosopher – Russell's paradox, Russell's teapot.
 Jim Russell, Australian cartoonist – Jim Russell Award.
 Reverend John Russell, British reverend and businessman – Jack Russell Terrier.
 Henry Norris Russell, American astronomer, and Ejnar Hertzsprung, Danish astronomer – Hertzsprung–Russell diagram
 Lord Rutherford, New Zealand physicist – rutherfordium.
 Johannes Rydberg, Swedish physicist – Rydberg constant, Rydberg formula, Rydberg unit, Rydberg atoms.
 Herbert John Ryser, American mathematician – Ryser's formula.

S 
 Sabellius, Christian theologist – Sabellianism
 Franz Sacher, Austrian confectioner – Sachertorte
 Leopold von Sacher-Masoch, German novelist – masochism
 Marquis de Sade, French novelist – sadism
 Sheikh Safi-ad-din Ardabili, Persian sheikh – Safavid dynasty, Safavids
 Charles Frederick Morris Saint, British surgeon – Saint's triad, a medical counterexample to Ockham's razor
 Claude Henri de Saint-Simon, French philosopher – Saint-Simonianism.
 Ulrich Salchow, Swedish figure skater – Salchow, figure skating jump
 Daniel Elmer Salmon, American pathologist – salmonella.
 Raimondo di Sangro, Prince of Sanseviero, Italian nobleman and alchemist – sanseveria.
 Shalmaneser V, Biblical king – 9-litre wine bottle (see Wine bottle#Sizes)
 Vasili Samarsky-Bykhovets, a Russian mine official – samarskite, the mineral after which the chemical element samarium has been named.
 Augusto Sandino, Nicaraguan president – Sandinism.
 John Montagu, 4th Earl of Sandwich, British earl – sandwiches and South Sandwich Islands.
 Thomas Sankara, Burkinabé president – Sankarism.
 Matthew Henry Phineas Riall Sankey, Irish civil engineer – Sankey diagram.
 Rick Santorum, American politician – spreading santorum
 Edward Sapir, American anthropologist – Sapir-Whorf hypothesis
 Sappho, Greek poet – sapphism (lesbianism), Sapphic stanza.
 Pierre-Auguste Sarrus, French inventor – Sarrusophone.
 Satan, Biblical character – Satanism, Satan's bolete
 Satyr, Greek mythological characters – satire.
 Muhammad bin Saud, Saudi royal – Saudi Arabia.
 Sigurd Johannes Savonius, Finnish inventor and architect – Savonius wind turbine
 Adolphe Sax, Belgian inventor – saxophone.
 Bartolus de Saxoferrato, Spanish jurist – Bartolism. 
 Gerald G. Schaber, American geologist - Schaber hill (also known as the North Complex, north of the landing site of Apollo 15).
 Wilhelm Schlenk, German chemist – Schlenk flask, Schlenk line.
 Alfred von Schlieffen, German general – Schlieffen Plan
 Bernhard Schmidt, German optician and inventor – Schmidt camera, aka "Schmidt telescope".
 Walter H. Schottky, German physicist – Schottky diode.
 Johann Schrammel and Josef Schrammel, Austrian violinists – Schrammelmusik.
 Erwin Schrödinger, Austrian physicist – Schrödinger equation, Schrödinger's cat, Schrödinger's Kittens – a book.
 Giovanni Antonio Scopoli, Italian botanist and biologist – scopolamine.
 Edward W. Scott, American businessman – The second letter of the company name BEA Systems, is taken from his first name.
 Robert Scott, British explorer – Amundsen–Scott South Pole Station
 Ebenezer Scrooge, British literary character – scrooge (a stingy miser)
 Glenn T. Seaborg, American physicist and chemist – seaborgium.
 Richard Sears and Alvah Roebuck, American businessmen – Sears, Roebuck; stores bear only the Sears name
 Chief Seattle, Native American tribal leader – City of Seattle
 Laura Secord, Canadian national heroine – Laura Secord Chocolates
 Thomas Johann Seebeck, German physicist – Seebeck effect
 Josef Sekanina, Czech mineralogist – mineral Sekaninaite.
 Haile Selassie, Ethiopian emperor – Rastafari (which is derived from his real name: Ras Tafari Makonnen).
 Harry Gordon Selfridge, American business man – Selfridges
 Edgar Selwyn and Archibald Selwyn, American film producers who used the last three letters of their name along with the first four of Samuel Goldfish to create Goldwyn Picture Corporation, which later merged into Metro–Goldwyn–Mayer (or MGM)
 Ignaz Semmelweis, Hungarian physician – Semmelweis reflex.
 Claude de la Sengle, Maltese knight – Senglea
 The Serendip princes, Indian fairy tale characters – serendipity
 Sequoyah, American–Cherokee silversmith – Sequoia (genus), Sequoyah County, Oklahoma.
 Carl Keenan Seyfert, American astronomer - Seyfert's Sextet.
 Max Shachtman, American politician – Shachtmanism.
 William Shakespeare, British playwright – Shakespearean, Shakespearean actor, Shakespearean age, Shakespeare quadrangle, Shakespeare (programming language),
 Adi Shamir, Israeli computer scientist – the second letter of the name RSA, an asymmetric algorithm for public key cryptography, is taken from Shamir.
 Shem, Biblical character – semitism.
 Roger Shepard, American cognitive scientist – Shepard tone.
 Reginald V. Shepherd and Harold Turpin, American inventors – sten gun (derived from their last names). 
 William Tecumseh Sherman, American general – Sherman necktie, Shermanesque statement, Sherman tank.
 Beatrice Shilling, aviation engineering researcher – Miss Shilling's orifice, a device to ensure fuel flow in aero-engines when in a dive.
 Shiva, Indian mythological character – Shaivism
 Shmoo, American comics character – Shmoo plot
 Henry S. Shrapnel, British general and inventor – shrapnel.
 Henry Miller Shreve, American inventor and steamboat captain – Shreveport, Louisiana.
 Jean Sibelius, Finnish composer – Sibelius notation program, Sibelius Software Ltd
 Werner von Siemens, German business man – siemens, Siemens AG.
 Rolf Sievert, Swedish physicist – sievert (unit of radiation dose equivalent).
 Norodom Sihanouk, Cambodian king – Sihanoukism.
 Etienne de Silhouette, French politician – silhouette
 Leon "Lee" Silver, American geologist - Silver spur (a lunar mountain east of Mons Hadley Delta, south of the landing site of Apollo 15)
 Simon Magus or "Simon the Magician", Biblical character – simony
 Issac Merritt Singer, American inventor – Singer Corporation
 Sisyphus, Greek mythological character – Sisyphus beetle, Sisyphus effect, Sisyphism.
 Sixtus IV, Italian pope – Sistine chapel.
 Henrik Sjögren, Swedish physician – Sjögren's syndrome
 Alexander Skene, Scottish gynaecologist – Skene's gland
 BF Skinner, American psychologist – Skinner box
 Emil Škoda, Czech car designer  – Škoda
 Delia Smith, British cook – Delia effect
 Horace Smith and Daniel B. Wesson, American gun inventors  – Smith & Wesson
 Maria Ann Smith, British-Australian businesswoman – Granny Smith
 William Smith, English geologist – Smith's laws
 Edward Smith-Stanley, 12th Earl of Derby, British nobleman – Derby (horse race), particularly The Derby
 Oliver R. Smoot, American student – smoot.
 The Smurfs, Belgian comics characters – Smurf (Smurf language), Smurf attack, Smurfing.
 Hermann Snellen, Dutch ophthmalmologist – Snellen chart
 Willebrord Snellius, Dutch astronomer and mathematicianc – Snell's law
 Socrates, Greek philosopher – Socratic Method, Socratic dialogue.
 Alexey Sokolsky, Ukrainian-Belarusian chess player – Sokolsky Opening
 Sól, Norse mythological character – Sunday.
 Daniel Solander, Swedish botanist – Solander box
 Solomon, Biblical character – Judgment of Solomon , Solomon Islands.
 Somhairle mac Giolla Brighde, King of the Isles, Clann Somhairle
 Sondermann, German comics character – Sondermann Award.
 John Sotheby, British businessman – Sotheby's.
 John Philip Sousa, American composer – sousaphone
 Edwin Southern, British biologist – Southern blot.
 Paul-Henri Spaak, Belgian politician and diplomat – Spaak method. 
 Spartacus, Thracian resistance leader – Spartacus League.
 George Spencer, 2nd Earl Spencer, British politician – Spencer (clothing)
 Thomas Spencer, British business people – Marks and Spencer
 Edmund Spenser, British playwright – Spenserian stanza.
 Baruch Spinoza, Dutch philosopher – Spinozism.
 William Archibald Spooner, British teacher – spoonerism.
 Alexsei Grigoryevich Stakhanov, Soviet miner – Stakhanovite.
 Konstantin Stanislavski, Russian playwright – Stanislavski's system. 
 Frederick Trent Stanley, American inventor – Stanley knife.
 Joseph Stalin, Russian head of state – Stalinism and neo-Stalinism (also see De-Stalinization), see List of places named after Joseph Stalin, Joseph Stalin Museum, Stalinist architecture, Stalin Society, Stalin Prize, Stalin Peace Prize, Iosif Stalin tank
 Johannes Stark, German physicist – Stark spectroscopy, Stark effect
 Howard Staunton, British chess player – Staunton Gambit.
 Jozef Stefan and Ludwig Boltzmann, Austrian physicists – Stefan–Boltzmann constant.
 Stendhal, French novelist – Stendhal syndrome.
 Édouard Stephan, French astronomer - Stephan's Quintet.
 George Stephenson, British inventor – Geordie lamp. 
 Charles Stent, British dentist – a "stent" (tooth filling)
 Stentor, Greek mythological character – stentorian (being loud-voiced)
 John B. Stetson, American inventor – Stetson hat.
 John K. Stewart and Arthur P. Warner, American business people – Stewart–Warner
 Helmut Stief, German inventor – Stiefografie.
 Thomas Joannes Stieltjes, Dutch mathematician Riemann–Stieltjes integral.
 Robert Stirling, Scottish inventor – Stirling engine.
 George Gabriel Stokes, Irish physicist and mathematician – stokes, unit of viscosity
 Marshall Harvey Stone, American mathematician – Stone–von Neumann theorem, Stone–Čech compactification, Stone's representation theorem for Boolean algebras, Stone space, Stone–Weierstrass theorem, Stone's representation theorem for distributive lattices, Stone duality, Stone's theorem on one-parameter unitary groups, Banach–Stone theorem
 Antonio Stradivari, Italian violin builder – Stradivari.
 Gregor Strasser, German politician – Strasserism.
 Leo Strauss, German-American philosopher – Straussianism.
 Levi Strauss, American business man – Levi Strauss & Co.
 William Strauss, American historian – Strauss-Howe generational theory
 Barbra Streisand, American actress and singer – Streisand effect (censorship that has the unintended consequence of publicizing the information more widely.)
 Count Stroganov (possibly Alexander Stroganov or Count Grigory Stroganov), Russian aristocrat – Stroganoff
 John McDouall Stuart, Scottish explorer – Stuart Highway, Central Mount Stuart
 Rashid Sunyaev and Yakov B. Zel'dovich, Russian physicists  – Sunyaev–Zel'dovich effect
 Michio Suzuki, Japanese business man – Suzuki.
 Shinichi Suzuki, Japanese musicologist and violinist – Suzuki method.
 Sage Kambu Swayambhuva, Indian mythological character – Cambodia
 Theodor Svedberg, Swedish chemist – svedberg (unit of sedimentation rate)
 Svengali, British literary character – a svengali (one who manipulates or controls somebody), Svegali defense.
 Gordon Swann, American geologist — Swann range (a section of the Montes Apenninus on the moon, east of the landing site of Apollo 15)
 Daniel Swarovski, Bohemian-born Austrian glass cutter and jeweler - Swarovski
 Thomas Townshend, viscount of Sydney, British politician – Sydney, Nova Scotia, Canada and Sydney, Australia.
 Sylvester I, Italian pope – Saint Sylvester's Day.
 Syphilus, character in Girolamo Fracastoro's poem Syphilis sive morbus gallicus – syphilis.
 Syrinx, Greek mythological character – syringe, "syrinx" (singing organ of songbirds).

T 
 Tages, Etruscan prophet – tagetes.
 William Henry Fox Talbot, British inventor – Talbotype, Talbot effect.
 Chairul Tanjung, Indonesian businessman – CT Corp
 James Mourilyan Tanner, British paediatrician – Tanner stage.
 Tarik-ibn-Ziyad (from Arabic djebl al-Tarik or "mountain of Tarik"), Muslim commander – Gibraltar.
 Siegbert Tarrasch, German chess player – Tarrasch Defense, Tarrasch Trap, Tarrasch rule.
 Tarzan, British literary character – Tarzanesque, Tarzan yell, Tarzan pants (loin cloth in leopard motif).
 Abel Tasman, Dutch explorer – Tasmania, Tasman Sea, Tasman Region, Abel Tasman National Park, Tasman Bay / Te Tai-o-Aorere.
 J. R. D. Tata, French-Indian aviator and businessman – Tata.
 Saint Tatiana, Roman Christian saint – Tatiana Day.
 Stéphanie Tatin and Caroline Tatin, French restaurant owners – Tarte Tatin.
 Frederick Winslow Taylor, American engineer – Taylorism.
 Shirley Temple, American film actress – Shirley Temple Soda.
 Terry-Thomas, British actor and comedian – Terry Thomas sign.
 Nikola Tesla, Serbian-Croatian inventor – Tesla coil, tesla – unit of magnetic flux density.
 Luisa Tetrazzini, Italian operatic soprano – Chicken Tetrazzini 
 Osamu Tezuka, Japanese manga (comics) artist – Tezuka Osamu Cultural Prize, Tezuka Award.
 Thanatos, Greek mythological character – thanatophobia, thanatology, thanatophoric dysplasia, euthanasia, thanatosensitivity, thanatosis.
 Margaret Thatcher, British Prime Minister – Thatcherism, Thatcher illusion.
 Leon Theremin, Russian inventor – Theremin, Theremin cello.
 Thespis, Greek actor – thespian, thespis (plant), thespis (mantis), thespis wagon.
 Lou Thesz, American wrestler – Lou Thesz press.
 W. I. Thomas and Dorothy Swaine Thomas, American sociologists – Thomas theorem. 
 Thor, Norse mythological character – thorium.
 August Thyssen, German businessman – Thyssen, ThyssenKrupp.
 Ting Hai, Hong Kong film character – Ting Hai effect.
 Tinker Bell, British literary character – Tinkerbell effect.
 Tintin, Belgian comics character – Tintin trousers
 Titan, Greek mythological character – RMS Titanic, titanium.
 Christopher Titus – Titus, an Emmy nominated TV series broadcast on FOX from 2000 to 2002.
 Johann Daniel Titius and Johann Elert Bode, German astronomers – Titius–Bode Law.
 Josip Broz Tito, Yugoslavian president – titoism, Titovka (cap).
 Saint Thomas, Biblical character –  a "disbelieving/doubting Thomas" (someone who lacks faith), São Tomé and Príncipe, Saint Thomas Tower.
 John T. Thompson, American inventor – Thompson submachine gun, aka the "Tommy gun".
 James Tobin, American economist – Tobin tax.
 J.R.R. Tolkien, South-African/British novelist – Tolkienology.
 Lorenzo de Tonti, Italian businessman – tontine.
 Howard Henry Tooth, British neurologist – Charcot–Marie–Tooth disease.
 Carlos Torre Repetto – Torre Attack.
 Evangelista Torricelli, Italian mathematician and inventor – torr (unit of pressure), Torricelli's Law, Torricelli's equation.
 Linus Torvalds, Finnish computer programmer – Linus's law, Linux operating system (from Linus' Minix), Tux – mascot of Linux (from Torvald's Unix).
 Charles Townshend, British politician  – Townshend Acts.
 Arnold Toynbee, British economist – Toynbee Hall.
 Sakichi Toyoda, Japanese businessman – Toyota.
 Trajan, Roman emperor – Trajan's Column, Trajan's Wall.
 Friedrich Trautwein, German inventor - Trautonium.
 Trillian, British literary character – Trillian (software), Project Trillian.
 Octavio Trompowsky, Brazilian chess player – Trompowsky Attack.
 Leon Trotsky, Russian politician and writer – Trotskyism
 Harry S. Truman, American president – Truman doctrine
 Donald Trump, American businessman and politician – Trump Tower, the Trump International Hotel and Tower, Trump Plaza etc.
 Mikhail Tugan-Baranovsky, Russian economist – Tugan-Baranovskii theory of business cycles
 Túpac Amaru II, Peruvian resistance leader – Tupamaros.
 Alan Turing, British mathematician and inventor – Turing machine, Turing-complete, Turing tarpit, Turing test, Church–Turing thesis, Church–Turing–Deutsch principle.
 J. M. W. Turner, English painter – Turner Prize
 Ted Turner, American business man – Turner Entertainment, Turner Classic Movies, Turner Broadcasting System or TBS, TBS Superstation, WTBS, Turner Network Television or TNT, Turner Tomorrow Fellowship Award.
 Marie Tussaud, French sculptor – Madame Tussauds.
 Maurice Tweedie, physicist and statistician – Tweedie distribution.

U 
 Antonio de Ulloa, Spanish naval officer, scientist, and administrator - Ulloa's circle (also known as Bouguer's halo and the Fog bow)
 Uranus, Greek-Roman mythological character – uranium, Uranus
 Urhunden, Swedish comics character – Urhunden Prize
 Saint Ursula, Christian martyr – Ursulines

V 
 Saint Valentine, Roman martyr – Valentine's Day.
 Rudolph Valentino, Italian-American actor – Valentino's syndrome.
 Jean Parisot de Valette, French nobleman – Valletta.
 Antonio Maria Valsalva, Italian physician – Valsalva maneuver, Valsalva device.
 Vanadis, synonym for the Norse mythological character Freyja – vanadium.
 James Van Allen, American astronomer – Van Allen radiation belt.
 George Vancouver, British explorer – Vancouver, British Columbia, Vancouver, Washington, Vancouver Island.
 Constant Vanden Stock, Belgian association football player and manager – Constant Vanden Stock Stadium.
 Johannes Diderik van der Waals, Dutch physicist – Van der Waals force.
 Robert J. Van de Graaff, American physicist – Van de Graaff generator.
 Adriaan van Maanen, Dutch-American astronomer - van Maanen's star.
 Dolly Varden, British literary character (from Charles Dickens' Barnaby Rudge) – Dolly Varden (costume).
 Harry Vardon, British golfer – Vardon grip.
 Publius Quinctilius Varus, Roman general – Varian disaster (The Battle of the Teutoburg Forest).
 Rip Van Winkle, American literary character – a "rip van winkle" (someone who sleeps too much.)
 Philippe de Vendôme, French nobleman – Place Vendôme, Vendôme Tower, Vendôme Battery, Vendôme Redoubt
 Saint Venera, Italian Christian martyr. – Santa Venera, Santa Venerina, Santa Verna.
 Eleftherios Venizelos, Greek politician – Venizelism. 
 John Venn, British mathematician – Venn diagram.
 Venus, Greek-Roman mythological character – Venus (planet), mons veneris or mons Venus, venereal disease, Venus flytrap, Venus symbol, Belt of Venus.
 Hugues Loubenx de Verdalle, Maltese bishop – Verdala Palace.
 Jules Verne, French novelist – Verneshot.
 Pierre Vernier, French mathematician – Vernier scale.
 Edward Vernon, British naval officer, whose nickname was "Old Grog" – "groggy", Mount Vernon
 Vespasian, Roman emperor – vespasienne.
 Amerigo Vespucci, Italian explorer – America.
 Vesta, Roman mythological character – Vestalia, Vestal virgin, Vesta case. 
 Victoria, Roman mythological character – victory.
 Queen Victoria, British queen – Queensland, Victoria (Australia), Victoria, British Columbia, Victoria Island, Victoria Strait, Great Victoria Desert, Lake Victoria, Victoria, Gozo, Victoria Harbour, London Victoria station, Victoria line, Victorian era, Queen Victoria Street, London, Victoria Cross, Victoria Land, Victoria Tower, Royal Victoria Dock, Victoria and Albert Museum, Victorian architecture, Victorian house, Victoria, Seychelles, Victoria Lines, Victoria plum, Victoria sponge cake
 António Manoel de Vilhena, Portuguese nobleman – Fort Manoel, Manoel Island, Manoel Theatre.
 Saint Vincent, Christian martyr – Saint Vincent and the Grenadines.
 Leonardo da Vinci, Italian artist and scientist – Leonardeschi, Davinciite, Davincia, Da Vinci Machine.
 Virgil, Roman poet – Sortes Vergilianae, Virgilian.
 Artturi Ilmari Virtanen, Finnish chemist – AIV fodder.
 Andrew Viterbi, Italian-American engineer – Viterbi algorithm, Viterbi decoder.
 Vitruvius, Roman architect – Vitruvian Man.
 Vishnu, Hindu deity – Vaishnavism.
 Alessandro Volta, Italian physicist – the volt, a unit of electromotive force, voltage, the Volta Prize.
 Vulcan, Greek–Roman mythological character – volcano.
 Vulcans, American television characters – Vulcan salute.

W 
 Barnes Wallis, British inventor – Barnes Wallis Moth Machine (not invented by him, but named after him.)
 Robert Wade, New Zealand-British chess player – Wade Defence
 Richard Wagner, German composer – Wagnerian, Wagner tuba
 Muhammad ibn Abd al-Wahhab, Saudi-Arabian theologist – Wahhabi movement
 Alfred Russel Wallace, Welsh biologist – Wallace Line, Wallace's flying frog, Operation Wallacea, Wallacea
 Peter Waldo, French religious leader – Waldensians
 Samuel Wallis, British explorer– Wallis and Futuna
 Egide Walschaerts, Belgian engineer – Walschaerts valve gear
 Walpurga, English missionary – Walpurgis Night
 Adam Walsh, American rape and murder victim – Code Adam
 Sam Walton, American businessman – Walmart and Sam's Club
 Preston Ware, American chess player – Ware Opening
 Albert Warner, Harold Warner, Jack L. Warner and Sam Warner, American film producers – Warner Bros.
 Arthur P. Warner and John K. Stewart, American businesspeople – Stewart–Warner
 Earl Warren, American chief of justice – Warren Commission
 George Washington, American general and president – Washington and Washington, D.C.
 Karlman Wasserman, American physiologist — Wasserman 9-Panel Plot
 James Watt, Scottish inventor – watt
 Thomas William Webb, British astronomer - Webb's wreath (a telescopic asterism in the constellation Hercules, called Webb's wreath by amateur astronomers) 
 Ernst Heinrich Weber, German psychologist – Weber's law, Weber test, Weberian apparatus
 Wilhelm Eduard Weber, German physicist – weber
 Friedrich Wegener, German pathologist – Wegener's granulomatosis (not discovered by him, now known as granulomatosis with polyangiitis)
 Peter J. Weinberger – the second letter of the name awk, a computer pattern/action language, is taken from Weinberger
 August Weismann, German biologist – Weismannism
 Sam Weller, British literary character – wellerism
 Duke of Wellington, British general and Prime Minister – Beef Wellington, Wellington boot, Wellington (New Zealand), Wellingtonia (tree)
 H. G. Wells, British novelist – Wellsian
 Eudora Welty, American novelist – Eudora, an e-mail client.
 Carl Wernicke, German neurologist – Wernicke's aphasia, Wernicke's area, Wernicke encephalopathy, Wernicke–Korsakoff syndrome.
 Werther, German literary character – Werther effect.
 Mae West, American actress – Mae West jacket
 Thomas West, 3rd Baron De La Warr, British politician – Delaware
 Thomas Aldridge Weston, American inventor – Weston differential pulley
 George Whipple, American physician – Whipple's disease
 Joseph Whitworth, British engineer – Whitworth rifle
 Frederick Methvan Whyte, American engineer – Whyte notation
 Knut Wicksell, Swedish economist – Wicksell effect, Wicksell's theory of capital
 Wilhelm Wien, Russian mathematician – Wien's displacement law
 Alof de Wignacourt, French-Maltese nobleman – Wignacourt Aqueduct, Wignacourt towers, Wignacourt Tower
 Eugene Wigner, Hungarian-American mathematician – Wigner's friend
 Paul Wild, British-born Australian scientist - Wild's Triplet
 Private Wilhelm, American film character from the film The Charge at Feather River (1953) – Wilhelm scream
 Erik Adolf von Willebrand, Finnish physician – Von Willebrand disease, Von Willebrand factor
 Jan Frans Willems, Belgian writer and activist – Willemsfonds
 Max Wilms, German physician – Wilms' tumor
 Charles Thomson Rees Wilson, Scottish physician – Wilson cloud chamber, Wilson condensation cloud
 Samuel Alexander Kinnier Wilson, American-British physician – Wilson's disease, Wilson disease protein
 Oliver Winchester, American inventor – Winchester rifle
 Caspar Wistar, American physicist – Wisteria
 William Withering, British botanist – witherite
 Georg Wittig, German chemist – Wittig reaction
 Władysław II Jagiełło, Polish king – Jagiellonian University
 Max Wolf, Knut Lundmark, Philibert Jacques Melotte, astronomers - Wolf-Lundmark-Melotte (WLM) system, a barred irregular galaxy at the outer edges of the Local Group
 Caspar Friedrich Wolff, German physiologist – Wolffian duct
 Robert W. Wood, American physicist - Wood's Spot, a yellowish colored area on the moon (northwest of crater Aristarchus).
 Frank Winfield Woolworth, American businessman – Woolworth Building
 Ferdinand von Wrangel, German explorer – Wrangel Island
 Doug Wright, Canadian cartoonist – Doug Wright Award
 Josef Wronski, Polish mathematician – Wronskian
 Charles Adolphe Wurtz, French chemist – Wurtz reaction, Wurtzite

X 
 Xanthippe, wife of Greek philosopher Socrates – xanthippe (dominant, difficult female partner), Xanthippe's shrew
 Anthony Xerri, Maltese man who discovered a cave – Xerri's Grotto
 Francisco Ximénez de Tejada, Maltese religious leader – Ximenes Redoubt

Y 
 The Yellow Kid, American comics character – yellow journalism, Yellow Kid Award.
 Pops Yoshimura, Japanese businessman – Yoshimura motorcycle tuning company
 Thomas Young, British scientist – Young's modulus and Young's slits

Z 
 Walter J. Zable, American businessman and football player – Zable Stadium for college football
 Frank J. Zamboni, Italian-American inventor – Zamboni ice resurfacer
 Emiliano Zapata, Mexican revolutionary – zapatista
 Frank Zappa, American rock artist and composer – Zappaesque
 Mao Zedong, Chinese head of state – maoism
 Pieter Zeeman, Dutch physicist – Zeeman effect
 Eduard Zeis, German physician – glands of Zeis
 Helmut Zeisel, German mathematician – Zeisel number
 Martin Zelder, American economist – Zelder paradox
 Zeno of Elea, Greek philosopher – Paradox of Zeno
 Zephyr, Greek mythological character – zephyr
 Ferdinand von Zeppelin, German inventor – zeppelin
 Zog I of Albania, Albanian king – Zogist salute.  
 Zoroaster, Persian religious leader – Zoroastrianism
 Fritz Zwicky, Swiss astronomer - Zwicky's Triplet
 Huldrich Zwingli, Swiss religious leader – Zwinglianism

See also 
 Lists of etymologies

Sources 

 
Eponyms